Dr. Jivraj Mehta Institute of Technology (DJMIT) is an engineering institute located in Anand, Gujarat, India. It is named after the first Chief Minister of Gujarat Jivraj Narayan Mehta. It was established in July 2010.

It is located near Anand - home to the headquarters of Amul (the world’s largest farmers’ cooperative movement) and NDDB.

History 
The college was founded in 2010. It is located in the Mogar suburban district of Anand,  . Within Gujarat, India,
Dr. Jivraj Mehta Institute of Technology Mogar is managed by Charttar Education and Navrachana Trust, (CENT). Shri Narendra Shrimali is the Chairman of the Governing Council.

Dr. Jivraj Mehta Institute of Technology Mogar is affiliated with Gujarat Technological University (GTU), the Technical University of Gujarat and also approved by the All India Council for Technical Education (AICTE), New Delhi.

Campus 

Sports fields are available for various games such as cricket, football (commonly known as soccer or Association football, not to be confused with American Football) and various indoor games facilities such as table tennis, carom board and chess. The institute is well connected to the national highway, having its own exit.

Academics

Undergraduate studies 
Dr. Jivraj Mehta Institute of Technology offers the following degree programmes with AICTE approval and affiliation to Gujarat Technological University, Ahmedabad.

The following table shows branch-wise intake from the institute.

Education environment 

 Software Systems including Packet Tracer for computer Network, Nokia Mobile and Android toolkit for Mobile Application Development, Various Automated Software Testing Tools for SDLC.
 Software System like MATLAB, TINA PRO, Embedded System, Crossware Development Tool, Microcontroller VPB (Integrated Development Environment), Mobile Communication Trainer kit, Optical Training Communication kit, Microwave Workbench  are in the E&C Department.
 Software System like MATLAB, Power System Programming In C Language; fully Equipped high voltage laboratory in the Electrical Engineering department.
 Developed Panels of Power System Protection indigenously in College by Electrical Engineering Department.

References

External links 

 Official website of College of Engineering - DJMIT
 Gujarat Technological University
 Gujarat University homepage

Engineering colleges in Gujarat
Education in Anand district